Grażyna Staszak-Makowska (born 1 November 1953) is a Polish fencer. She competed in the women's individual and team foil events at the 1976 Summer Olympics.

References

1953 births
Living people
Polish female fencers
Olympic fencers of Poland
Fencers at the 1976 Summer Olympics
Sportspeople from Bydgoszcz
20th-century Polish women